Stephen Walsh (26 August 1859 – 16 March 1929) was a British miner, trade unionist and Labour Party politician.

Background
Born in Liverpool, Walsh became an orphan at a very young age. He was educated at an industrial school in the Kirkdale area of the city, leaving school aged 13 to work in a coalmine in Ashton in Makerfield.

Political career
Walsh was an official of the Lancashire and Cheshire Miners' Federation before he was elected to parliament for Ince in the 1906 general election. Later that year he attacked the idea that an MP needed an Oxbridge education further adding that: "To use an arithmetical metaphor,  the Labour party had reduced the points of difference among the working classes to the lowest common denominator, and had promoted and developed the greatest common measure of united action".

Walsh was a member of David Lloyd George's Coalition Government as Parliamentary Secretary to the Ministry of National Service in 1917 and as Parliamentary Secretary to the Local Government Board from 1917 to 1919.

Walsh stood in the 1918 election as a Coalition Labour candidate opposed by the official Labour Party. He was vice-president of National Union of Mineworkers from 1922 to 1924 until he was appointed Secretary of State for War by Ramsay MacDonald in January 1924, a post he held until the government fell in November of the same year. He was sworn of the Privy Council in January 1924.

Family
One of Walsh's sons died in World War I. Walsh himself died in March 1929, aged 69.

References

External links
 Stephen Walsh at Spartacus Educational
Stephen Walsh at Hansard

1859 births
1929 deaths
English miners
Labour Party (UK) MPs for English constituencies
Miners' Federation of Great Britain-sponsored MPs
People from Ashton-in-Makerfield
UK MPs 1906–1910
UK MPs 1910
UK MPs 1910–1918
UK MPs 1918–1922
UK MPs 1922–1923
UK MPs 1923–1924
UK MPs 1924–1929
Vice Presidents of the National Union of Mineworkers (Great Britain)
Members of the Privy Council of the United Kingdom